Kalu Lal Shrimali (December 1909 – 5 January 2000) was the Union Education Minister for the Government of India and also a distinguished parliamentarian and an educationist.

He was born in December 1909 at Udaipur and had his education at Banaras Hindu University, Calcutta University and Columbia University, New York.

He served as Minister of Education in the Union Council of Ministers from May 1955 to August 1963. Shrimali represented the State of Rajasthan in Rajya Sabha from April 1952 to April 1956 and from April 1956 to April 1962.

He was associated with several educational and various social welfare organizations. Shrimali was editor of "Jan Shikshan" a monthly educational magazine and had several publications to his credit. He was one of the founders of the famous Vidya Bhawan School, Udaipur (Rajasthan), which was established in Baden Powell’s Boy Scout Movement. He was awarded Padma Vibhushan in 1976 for his contribution to education.

He died on 5 January 2000 at the age of 90 in Udaipur, Rajasthan.

References 

20th-century Indian educational theorists
Rajasthani politicians
Rajasthani people
University of Calcutta alumni
Recipients of the Padma Vibhushan in literature & education
Education ministers
Columbia University alumni
Banaras Hindu University alumni
People from Udaipur
1909 births
2000 deaths
Vice Chancellors of Banaras Hindu University
Rajya Sabha members from Rajasthan
India MPs 1962–1967
Lok Sabha members from Rajasthan
Politicians from Udaipur
Education Ministers of India
People from Bhilwara district